The 2012 Individual Long Track/Grasstrack World Championship was the 42nd edition of the FIM speedway Individual Long Track World Championship.

The world title was won by Joonas Kylmäkorpi of Finland for the third consecutive year.

Venues

Final Classification

References 

2012
Speedway competitions in France
Speedway competitions in Germany
Speedway competitions in the Netherlands
Speedway competitions in Norway
Speedway competitions in Finland
2012 in Dutch motorsport
2012 in German motorsport
2012 in French motorsport
2012 in Finnish sport
2012 in Norwegian sport